Bäsk is a Swedish-style liquor flavored with wormwood ("malört" in Swedish) or anise. Sweden is one of the few countries that has never banned absinthe or other wormwood-flavored liquors. Bäsk is an old alternative spelling of the word besk which means "bitter".

In the United States, the Chicago-based brand Jeppson's Malört is one of the most well-known versions of the liquor.

Bäsk is said to be good for digestion, and therefore is traditionally associated with fatty foods.

See also
Vermouth

References

Distilled drinks
Swedish culture
Bitters
Swedish distilled drinks